The Redder, the Better, released on May 21, 2006 through Triple Attack Records in conjunction with Luchador Records, is the debut EP and first official release from the upstate New York-based post-hardcore/indie rock band Polar Bear Club. It gained the band an unexpected growth of fanbase and received mostly very favorable reviews.

Track listing

Release history

Personnel

Polar Bear Club
 Jimmy Stadt - vocals
 Chris Browne - guitar, backing vocals 
 Greg Odom - bass
 Bob O'Neil - drums

Studio personnel
 John Naclerio - production and engineering

 Additional personnel
Rob Antonucci - artwork and illustration
Jenna Carrington - artwork and illustration

Details
 Recording type: studio
 Recording mode: stereo
 SPARS code: n/a

References

External links
 Polar Bear Club MySpace
 Polar Bear Club Facebook
 Polar Bear Club PureVolume
 Polar Bear Club Last.fm
 Nada Recording Studio Website
 Nada Recording Studio MySpace
 John Naclerio MySpace
 John Naclerio Twitter

Polar Bear Club albums
2006 EPs